Albert John Platts (q1 1885 – after 1914) was an English footballer who made 29 appearances in the Football League playing for Lincoln City. He played at inside left or outside left. He also played non-league football for clubs including Worksop Town, Scunthorpe & Lindsey United and Rotherham Town.

References

1885 births
Footballers from Worksop
English footballers
Association football forwards
Worksop Town F.C. players
Lincoln City F.C. players
Scunthorpe United F.C. players
Rotherham Town F.C. (1899) players
English Football League players
Date of birth missing
Place of death missing
1941 deaths